Elizabeth Savage may refer to:

 Elizabeth Savage, Countess Rivers (1581–1650), English courtier
 Elizabeth Savage (writer) (1918–1989), American novelist and short-story writer